The Continental Army was the army of the United Colonies  representing the Thirteen Colonies and later the United States during the American Revolutionary War. It was formed on June 14, 1775 by a resolution passed by the Second Continental Congress, meeting in Philadelphia after the war's outbreak. The Continental Army was created to coordinate military efforts of the colonies in the war against the British, who sought to maintain control over the American colonies. General George Washington was appointed commander-in-chief of the Continental Army and maintained this position throughout the war.

The Continental Army was supplemented by local militias and volunteer troops that were either loyal to individual states or otherwise independent. Most of the Continental Army was disbanded in 1783 after the Treaty of Paris formally ended the war. The Continental Army's 1st and 2nd Regiments went on to form what was to become the Legion of the United States in 1792, which ultimately served as the foundation for the creation of the U.S. Army.

Origins

The Continental Army consisted of soldiers from all 13 colonies and, after 1776, from all 13 states. The American Revolutionary War began at the Battles of Lexington and Concord on April 19, 1775, at a time when the colonial revolutionaries had no standing army. Previously, each colony had relied upon the militia (which was made up of part-time citizen-soldiers) for local defense; or the raising of temporary provincial troops during such crises as the French and Indian War of 1754–1763. As tensions with Great Britain increased in the years leading to the war, colonists began to reform their militias in preparation for the perceived potential conflict. Training of militiamen increased after the passage of the Intolerable Acts in 1774. Colonists such as Richard Henry Lee proposed forming a national militia force, but the First Continental Congress rejected the idea.

On April 23, 1775, the Massachusetts Provincial Congress authorized the raising of a colonial army consisting of 26 company regiments. New Hampshire, Rhode Island, and Connecticut soon raised similar but smaller forces. On June 14, 1775, the Second Continental Congress decided to proceed with the establishment of a Continental Army for purposes of common defense, adopting the forces already in place outside Boston (22,000 troops) and New York (5,000). It also raised the first ten companies of Continental troops on a one-year enlistment, riflemen from Pennsylvania, Maryland, Delaware, and Virginia to be used as light infantry, who became the 1st Continental Regiment in 1776. On June 15, 1775, Congress elected by unanimous vote George Washington as Commander-in-Chief, who accepted and served throughout the war without any compensation except for reimbursement of expenses.  Supporting Washington as commander in chief were four major-generals (Artemas Ward, Charles Lee, Philip Schuyler, and Israel Putnam) and eight brigadier-generals (Seth Pomeroy, Richard Montgomery, David Wooster, William Heath, Joseph Spencer, John Thomas, John Sullivan, and Nathanael Greene) As the Continental Congress increasingly adopted the responsibilities and posture of a legislature for a sovereign state, the role of the Continental Army became the subject of considerable debate. Some Americans had a general aversion to maintaining a standing army; but on the other hand, the requirements of the war against the British required the discipline and organization of a modern military. As a result, the army went through several distinct phases, characterized by official dissolution and reorganization of units.

Broadly speaking, Continental forces consisted of several successive armies or establishments:
 The Continental Army of 1775, comprising the initial New England Army, was organized by Washington into three divisions, six brigades, and 38 regiments. Major General Philip Schuyler's ten regiments in New York were sent to invade Canada.
 The Continental Army of 1776, was reorganized after the initial enlistment period of the soldiers in the 1775 army had expired. Washington had submitted recommendations to the Continental Congress almost immediately after he had accepted the position of Commander-in-Chief, but the Congress took time to consider and implement these. Despite attempts to broaden the recruiting base beyond New England, the 1776 army remained skewed toward the Northeast both in terms of its composition and of its geographical focus. This army consisted of 36 regiments, most standardized to a single battalion of 768 men strong and formed into eight companies, with a rank-and-file strength of 640.
 The Continental Army of 1777–1780 evolved out of several critical reforms and political decisions that came about when it became apparent that the British were sending substantial forces to put an end to the American Revolution. The Continental Congress passed the "Eighty-eight Battalion Resolve", ordering each state to contribute one-battalion regiments in proportion to their population, and Washington subsequently received authority to raise an additional 16 battalions. Enlistment terms extended to three years or to "the length of the war" to avoid the year-end crises that depleted forces (including the notable near-collapse of the army at the end of 1776, which could have ended the war in a Continental, or American, loss by forfeit)
 The Continental Army of 1781–1782 saw the greatest crisis on the American side in the war. Congress was bankrupt, making it very difficult to replenish the soldiers whose three-year terms had expired. Popular support for the war reached an all-time low, and Washington had to put down mutinies both in the Pennsylvania Line and in the New Jersey Line. Congress voted to cut funding for the Army, but Washington managed nevertheless to secure important strategic victories.
 The Continental Army of 1783–1784 was succeeded by the United States Army, which persists to this day. As peace was restored with the British, most of the regiments were disbanded in an orderly fashion, though several had already been diminished.

Soldiers

The Continental Army was a dirty, unorganized rabble that lacked the discipline typically expected of an army. When they first assembled, the count of how many soldiers George Washington had was delayed a little over a week. Instead of obeying their commanders and officers without question, each unit was a community that had democratically chosen its leaders. The regiments, coming from different states, were uneven in numbers. Logically, they should be evened, which would mean moving soldiers around. In the spirit of American republicanism, if George Washington separated the soldiers from the officers they had chosen they did not believe they should have to serve. George Washington had to give in to the soldiers and negotiate with them. He needed them to have an army.

Soldiers in the Continental Army were volunteers; they agreed to serve in the army and standard enlistment periods lasted from one to three years. Early in the war, the enlistment periods were short, as the Continental Congress feared the possibility of the Continental Army evolving into a permanent army. The army never numbered more than 48,000 men overall and 13,000 troops in one area. The turnover proved a constant problem, particularly in the winter of 1776–77, and longer enlistments were approved. As the new country (not yet fully independent) had no money, the government agreed to give grants to the soldiers which they could exchange for money. In 1781 and 1782, Patriot officials and officers in the Southern Colonies repeatedly implemented policies that offered slaves as rewards for recruiters who managed to enlist a certain number of volunteers in the Continental Army; in January 1781, Virginia's General Assembly passed a measure which announced that voluntary enlistees in the Virginia Line's regiments would be given a "healthy sound negro" as a reward.

The officers of both the Continental Army and the state militias were typically yeoman farmers with a sense of honor and status and an ideological commitment to oppose the policies of the British Crown.  The enlisted men were very different. They came from the working class or minority groups (Irish, German, African American). They were motivated to volunteer by specific contracts that promised bounty money; regular pay at good wages; food, clothing, and medical care; companionship; and the promise of land ownership after the war. They were unruly and would mutiny if the contractual terms were not met. By 1780–1781, threats of mutiny and actual mutinies were becoming serious.  Upwards of a fourth of Washington's army were of Irish origin, many being recent arrivals and in need of work.

The Continental Army was racially integrated, a condition the United States Army would not see again until the 1950s. During the Revolution, African American slaves were promised freedom in exchange for military service by both the Continental and British armies. Approximately 6,600 people of color (including African American, indigenous, and multiracial men) served with the colonial forces, and made up one-fifth of the Northern Continental Army.

In addition to the Continental Army regulars, state militia units were assigned for short-term service and fought in campaigns throughout the war. Sometimes the militia units operated independently of the Continental Army, but often local militias were called out to support and augment the Continental Army regulars during campaigns. The militia troops developed a reputation for being prone to premature retreats, a fact that General Daniel Morgan integrated into his strategy at the Battle of Cowpens and used to fool the British in 1781.

The financial responsibility for providing pay, food, shelter, clothing, arms, and other equipment to specific units was assigned to states as part of the establishment of these units. States differed in how well they lived up to these obligations. There were constant funding issues and morale problems as the war continued. This led to the army offering low pay, often rotten food, hard work, cold, heat, poor clothing and shelter, harsh discipline, and a high chance of becoming a casualty.

Keeping the continentals clothed was a difficult task and to do this Washington appointed James Mease, a merchant from Philadelphia. Mease worked closely with state-appointed agents to purchase clothing and things such as cow hides to make clothing and shoes for soldiers. Mease eventually resigned in 1777 and had compromised much of the organization of the Clothing Department. After this, on many accounts, the soldiers of the Continental Army were often poorly clothed, had few blankets, and often did not even have shoes. The problems with clothing and shoes for soldiers were often not the result of not having enough but of organization and lack of transportation. To reorganize the Board of War was appointed to sort out the clothing supply chain. During this time they sought out the help of France and for the remainder of the war, clothing was coming from over-sea procurement.

Operations

At the time of the Siege of Boston, the Continental Army at Cambridge, Massachusetts, in June 1775, is estimated to have numbered from 14 to 16,000 men from New England (though the actual number may have been as low as 11,000 because of desertions). Until Washington's arrival, it remained under the command of Artemas Ward. The British force in Boston was increasing by fresh arrivals. It numbered then about 10,000 men. The British controlled Boston, and defended it with their fleet, but were outnumbered and did not attempt to challenge the American control of New England. Washington selected young Henry Knox, a self-educated strategist, to take charge of the artillery from an abandoned British fort in upstate New York, and dragged across the snow to and placed them in the hills surrounding Boston in March 1776. The British situation was untenable. They negotiated an uneventful abandonment of the city and relocated their forces to Halifax in Canada. Washington relocated his army to New York. For the next five years, the main bodies of the Continental and British armies campaigned against one another in New York, New Jersey, and Pennsylvania. These campaigns included the notable battles of Trenton, Princeton, Brandywine, Germantown, and Morristown, among many others.

The army increased its effectiveness and success rate through a series of trials and errors, often at a great human cost. General Washington and other distinguished officers were instrumental leaders in preserving unity, learning and adapting, and ensuring discipline throughout the eight years of war. In the winter of 1777–1778, with the addition of Baron von Steuben, a Prussian expert, the training and discipline of the Continental Army was dramatically upgraded to modern European standards. This was during the infamous winter at Valley Forge. Washington always viewed the Army as a temporary measure and strove to maintain civilian control of the military, as did the Continental Congress, though there were minor disagreements about how this was to be carried out.

Throughout its existence, the Army was troubled by poor logistics, inadequate training, short-term enlistments, interstate rivalries, and Congress's inability to compel the states to provide food, money, or supplies. In the beginning, soldiers enlisted for a year, largely motivated by patriotism; but as the war dragged on, bounties and other incentives became more commonplace. Major and minor mutinies—56 in all—diminished the reliability of two of the main units  late in the war.

The French played a decisive role in 1781 as Washington's Army was augmented by a French expeditionary force under General Rochambeau and a squadron of the French navy under the Comte de Barras. By disguising his movements, Washington moved the combined forces south to Virginia without the British commanders in New York realizing it. This resulted in the capture of the main British invasion force in the south at Siege of Yorktown, which resulted in the American and their allied victory in the land war in North America and assured independence. Before the peace treaty went into effect in 1783, the British partly recovered by defeating the French fleet at the Battle of the Saintes.

Demobilization

A small residual force remained at West Point and some frontier outposts until Congress created the United States Army by their resolution of June 3, 1784.

Planning for the transition to a peacetime force had begun in April 1783 at the request of a congressional committee chaired by Alexander Hamilton. The commander-in-chief discussed the problem with key officers before submitting the army's official views on May 2. Significantly, there was a broad consensus on the basic framework among the officers. Washington's proposal called for four components: a small regular army, a uniformly trained and organized militia, a system of arsenals, and a military academy to train the army's artillery and engineer officers. He wanted four infantry regiments, each assigned to a specific sector of the frontier, plus an artillery regiment. His proposed regimental organizations followed Continental Army patterns but had a provision for increased strength in the event of war. Washington expected the militia primarily to provide security for the country at the start of a war until the regular army could expand—the same role it had carried out in 1775 and 1776. Steuben and Duportail submitted their own proposals to Congress for consideration.

Although Congress declined on May 12 to make a decision on the peace establishment, it did address the need for some troops to remain on duty until the British evacuated New York City and several frontier posts. The delegates told Washington to use men enlisted for fixed terms as temporary garrisons. A detachment of those men from West Point reoccupied New York without incident on November 25. When Steuben's effort in July to negotiate a transfer of frontier forts with Major General Frederick Haldimand collapsed, however, the British maintained control over them, as they would into the 1790s. That failure and the realization that most of the remaining infantrymen's enlistments were due to expire by June 1784 led Washington to order Knox, his choice as the commander of the peacetime army, to discharge all but 500 infantry and 100 artillerymen before winter set in. The former regrouped as Jackson's Continental Regiment under Colonel Henry Jackson of Massachusetts. The single artillery company, New Yorkers under John Doughty, came from remnants of the second Continental Artillery Regiment.

Congress issued a proclamation on October 18, 1783, which approved Washington's reductions. On November 2, Washington, then at Rockingham near Rocky Hill, New Jersey, released his Farewell Orders issued to the Armies of the United States of America to the Philadelphia newspapers for nationwide distribution to the furloughed men. In the message he thanked the officers and men for their assistance and reminded them that "the singular interpositions of Providence in our feeble condition were such, as could scarcely escape the attention of the most unobserving; while the unparalleled perseverance of the Armies of the United States, through almost every possible suffering and discouragement for the space of eight long years, was little short of a standing Miracle."

Washington believed that the blending of persons from every colony into "one patriotic band of Brothers" had been a major accomplishment, and he urged the veterans to continue this devotion in civilian life.

Washington said farewell to his remaining officers on December 4 at Fraunces Tavern in New York City. On December 23 he appeared in Congress, then sitting at Annapolis, and returned his commission as commander-in-chief: "Having now finished the work assigned me, I retire from the great theatre of Action; and bidding an Affectionate farewell to this August body under whose orders I have so long acted, I here offer my Commission, and take my leave of all the employments of public life." Congress ended the War of American Independence on January 14, 1784, by ratifying the definitive peace treaty that had been signed in Paris on September 3.

Congress again rejected Washington's concept for a peacetime force in October 1783. When moderate delegates then offered an alternative in April 1784 which scaled the projected army down to 900 men in one artillery and three infantry battalions, Congress rejected it as well, in part because New York feared that men retained from Massachusetts might take sides in a land dispute between the two states. Another proposal to retain 350 men and raise 700 new recruits also failed. On June 2 Congress ordered the discharge of all remaining men except twenty-five caretakers at Fort Pitt and fifty-five at West Point. The next day it created a peace establishment acceptable to all interests.

The plan required four states to raise 700 men for one year's service. Congress instructed the Secretary of War to form the troops into eight infantry and two artillery companies. Pennsylvania, with a quota of 260 men, had the power to nominate a lieutenant colonel, who would be the senior officer. New York and Connecticut each were to raise 165 men and nominate a major; the remaining 110 men came from New Jersey. The economy was the watchword of this proposal, for each major served as a company commander, and line officers performed all staff duties except those of chaplain, surgeon, and surgeon's mate. Under Josiah Harmar, the First American Regiment slowly organized and achieved permanent status as an infantry regiment of the new Regular Army. The lineage of the First American Regiment is carried on by the 3rd United States Infantry Regiment (The Old Guard).

However, the United States military realized it needed a well-trained standing army following St. Clair's Defeat on November 4, 1791, when a force led by General Arthur St. Clair was almost entirely wiped out by the Western Confederacy near Fort Recovery, Ohio. The plans, which were supported by U.S. President George Washington and Henry Knox, Secretary of War, led to the disbandment of the Continental Army and the creation of the Legion of the United States. The command would be based on the 18th-century military works of Henry Bouquet, a professional Swiss soldier who served as a colonel in the British Army, and French Marshal Maurice de Saxe. In 1792, Anthony Wayne, a renowned hero of the American Revolutionary War, was encouraged to leave retirement and return to active service as Commander-in-Chief of the Legion with the rank of major general.

The Legion was recruited and raised in Pittsburgh. It was formed into four sub-regions. These were created from elements of the 1st and 2nd Regiments from the Continental Army. These units then became the First and Second Sub-Legions. The Third and Fourth Sub-Legions were raised from further recruits. From June 1792 to November 1792, the Legion was stationed at Fort LaFayette in Pittsburgh.

Throughout the winter of 1792–1793, existing troops along with new recruits were drilled in military skills, tactics, and discipline at Legionville on the banks of the Ohio River near present-day Baden, Pennsylvania. The following Spring the newly named Legion of the United States left Legionville for the Northwest Indian War, a struggle between American Indian tribes affiliated with the Western Confederacy in the area south of the Ohio River. The overwhelmingly successful campaign was concluded with the decisive victory at Fallen Timbers on August 20, 1794, Maj. Gen. Anthony Wayne applied the techniques of wilderness operations perfected by Sullivan's 1779 expedition against the Iroquois. The training the troops received at Legionville was also seen as instrumental to this overwhelming victory.

Nevertheless, Steuben's Blue Book remained the official manual for the legion, as well as for the militia of most states, until Winfield Scott in 1835. In 1796, the United States Army was raised following the discontinuation of the legion of the United States. This preceded the graduation of the first cadets from United States Military Academy at West Point, New York, which was established in 1802.

Rank insignia
During the American Revolutionary War, the Continental Army initially wore ribbons, cockades, and epaulettes of various colors as an ad hoc form of rank insignia, as General George Washington wrote in 1775:

In 1776, captains were to have buff or white cockades.

Ranks in 1775

Later on in the war, the Continental Army established its own uniform with a black and white cockade among all ranks. Infantry officers had silver and other branches gold insignia:

This choice of units/ranks was introduced by Captain John Hancock. The suggested titles were then released for the Continental Army in 1779.

Ranks in 1780

Major battles
Siege of Boston
Battle of Long Island
Battle of Harlem Heights
Battle of Trenton
Battle of the Assunpink Creek
Battle of Princeton
Battle of Brandywine
Battle of Germantown
Battles of Saratoga
Battle of Monmouth
Siege of Charleston
Battle of Camden
Battle of Cowpens
Battle of Guilford Court House
Siege of Yorktown

See also

Pluckemin Continental Artillery Cantonment Site
History of the United States Army
Regulations for the Order and Discipline of the Troops of the United States
Peter Francisco, Revolutionary War soldier and hero
Middlebrook encampment near Middlebrook, New Jersey
 First Middlebrook encampment (1777)
 Second Middlebrook encampment (1778–79)
Jockey Hollow, near Morristown, New Jersey, winter of 1779–80
New Jersey Brigade Encampment Site, adjacent to Jockey Hollow, winter of 1779–80
List of infantry weapons in the American Revolution
 List of George Washington articles
 George Washington in the American Revolution

Notes

References

Citations

Sources and further reading
 Billias, George Athan, ed., George Washington's Generals (1980)
 Bodle, Wayne. The Valley Forge Winter: Civilians and Soldiers in War (2002)
 Carp, E. Wayne. To Starve the Army at Pleasure: Continental Army Administration and American Political Culture, 1775–1783. (U of North Carolina Press, 1984). .
 Cox, Caroline. A Proper Sense of Honor: Service and Sacrifice in George Washington's Army (2004). 
 Ferling, John. Whirlwind: The American Revolution and the War That Won It (2015).
 Fleming, Thomas. The Strategy of Victory: How General George Washington Won the American Revolution (Hachette UK, 2017).
 Gillett, Mary C. The Army Medical Department, 1775–1818. (Washington: Center of Military History, U.S. Army, 1981).
 Higginbotham, Don. The War of American Independence: Military Attitudes, Policies, and Practice, 1763–1789 (1971) on line.
 Lengel, Edward G. General George Washington: A Military Life. (2005).
 Martin, James Kirby, and Mark Edward Lender. A Respectable Army: The Military Origins of the Republic, 1763–1789. (2nd ed. Harlan Davidson), 2006. .
 Mayer, Holly A. Belonging to the Army: Camp Followers and Community during the American Revolution. Columbia: University of South Carolina Press, 1999. ; .
 Neimeyer, Charles Patrick. America Goes to War: A Social History of the Continental Army (1995) complete text online
 Palmer, Dave Richard. George Washington's Military Genius (2012).
 
 Royster, Charles. A Revolutionary People at War: The Continental Army and American Character, 1775–1783. (U of North Carolina Press, 1979). online
 , 451 pages, eBook 
 Bibliography of the Continental Army compiled by the United States Army Center of Military History

Primary sources
 Commager, Henry Steele, and Richard Brandon Morris, eds. The spirit of 'seventy-six: the story of the American Revolution as told by participants (1975). online
 Scheer, George F. Private Yankee Doodle: A Narrative of Some of the Adventures, Dangers and Sufferings of a Revolutionary Soldier [Joseph Plumb Martin]. (1962).
 
 RevWar75.com provides "an online cross-referenced index of all surviving orderly books of the Continental Army".

External links

"Von Steuben's Continentals", a video

 
1775 establishments in the Thirteen Colonies
18th-century history of the United States Army
18th-century military history of the United States
Disbanded armies